Baqerabad-e Tork (also Romanized as Bāqerābād-e Tork; also known as Torkeh Bāqerābād, Bāqirābād, and Bāqerābād) is a village in Basharyat-e Sharqi Rural District, Basharyat District, Abyek County, Qazvin Province, Iran. At the 2006 census, its population was 399, in 102 families.

References 

Populated places in Abyek County